Tyla may refer to:

People
 Sean Tyla (1946–2020), English musician
 Tyla (singer)
 Tyla Flexman (born 1986), Canadian hockey player
 Tyla Hanks (born 2000), Australian Australian rules football player
 Tyla Hepi (born 1993), New Zealand rugby player
 Tyla Nathan-Wong (born 1994), New Zealand rugby player
 Tyla Rattray (born 1985), South African motocross racer
 Tyla Yaweh, American rapper and singer
 Tyla-Jay Vlajnic (born 1990), Australian-born Serbian football player

Places
 Tyla, Perm Krai, Russia

Other
 Tyla (Bratz)